The Satellite Circuit was a temporary cycling venue constructed for the 1968 Summer Olympics in Mexico City. This venue hosted the road cycling individual road race and road team time trial events for those games.

External links
Sports-reference.com Mexico City Summer Olympics cycling 23 October 1968 men's individual road race results. Accessed 4 November 2010.
Sports-reference.com Mexico City Summer Olympics cycling 15 October 1968 men's road team time trial results. Accessed 4 November 2010.

Venues of the 1968 Summer Olympics
Defunct sports venues in Mexico
Sports venues in Mexico City
Olympic cycling venues